Superfluous means unnecessary or excessive. It may also refer to:

Superfluous precision, the use of calculated measurements beyond significant figures
The Diary of a Superfluous Man, an 1850 novella by Russian author Ivan Turgenev
Superfluous man, a Russian archetype inspired by the above novella

See also
Third wheel (disambiguation)
Fifth wheel (disambiguation)